Ajaypal Singh Banga (born November 10, 1959) is an Indian-born American business executive.
On February 23, 2023, he was nominated by President of the United States Joe Biden to lead the World Bank. He is currently vice chairman at General Atlantic. He was executive chairman of Mastercard, after having previously served as president and chief executive officer (CEO) of the company from July 2010 until December 31, 2020. He retired from this position on December 31, 2021, to join General Atlantic. His pay package in 2020 was $27.77 million. He is also the chairman of Netherlands-based investment holding company Exor and chairman of the public-private Partnership for Central America with U.S. Vice President Kamala Harris. 

Banga is the former chairman of the U.S.-India Business Council (USIBC) representing more than 300 of the largest international companies investing in India, and chairman of the International Chamber of Commerce. He is also a member of the board of directors of the Dow Chemical Company; member of the Council on Foreign Relations; and member of International Business Council of the World Economic Forum.

Banga has been nominated by President Joe Biden as President of the World Bank Group, a role which has traditionally been from the United States.

Early life and education
Ajay Banga was born on November 10, 1959, in Khadki cantonment of Pune, Bombay State, India (now in Maharashtra), into a Sikh family, where his father, an army officer, was posted. His family is originally from Jalandhar, Punjab. His father, Harbhajan Singh Banga, is a retired lieutenant-general who served in the Indian Army. He is the younger brother of businessman M. S. Banga.

Banga was educated at St. Edward's School, Shimla, and at the Hyderabad Public School in Hyderabad. He went on to graduate with a Bachelor of Arts (Honours) degree in Economics from the St. Stephen's College, Delhi followed by PGP in Management (equivalent to MBA) from the Indian Institute of Management, Ahmedabad.

Banga was naturalized a US citizen in 2007.

Business career

Early beginnings 
Beginning his business career as a management trainee with Nestlé in 1981, Banga spent the next 13 years working in jobs spanning sales, marketing, and general management. He later joined PepsiCo and was involved in the launch of its international fast food franchises, including Pizza Hut and KFC, in India as the economy liberalized.

Citigroup, 1996–2009 
In 1996, Banga joined Citigroup, where he briefly served as a debt collector as part of his training. He headed up CitiFinancial and the US Consumer Assets Division from 2000 to 2002 From 2005 to 2008 he was chief executive of Citi’s International Global Consumer Group, which included all credit card and consumer banking operations outside of North America. During that time, he spearheaded Citi's strategy in the microfinance sector across the world. 

In 2008, Banga became chief executive of the bank's Asia-Pacific business, and splitting time between New York and Hong Kong. In this capacity, he led a major reorganization of Citigroup’s Asian operations in 2008 that gave regional heads increased authority across the bank’s product lines. Banga received about $10 million in compensation in 2008 from Citigroup, making him one of the firm’s highest paid executives that year.

Mastercard, 2010–2021 
Mastercard announced in April 2010 that Banga, previously its chief operating officer (COO), would become president and chief executive officer, effective July 1, 2010, and a member of the board of directors. Banga succeeded Robert W. Selander, who had been CEO since March 1997. In his first year, he received $13.5 million in compensation.

During his tenure, Banga tripled revenues, increased net income sixfold and grew market capitalization from under $30 billon to more than $300 billion. In 2020, he announced the creation of the Priceless Planet Coalition, a group of about 100 firms that make corporate investments to preserve the environment, and launched Mastercard’s pledge to plant 100 million trees.

Later career 
In 2020 Banga was elected chairman of the International Chamber of Commerce (ICC) succeeding Paul Polman. He previously served as ICC's First Vice-Chair since June 2018. 

On January 1 2022, Banga assumed responsibilities at General Atlantic as vice chairman.

Career in the public sector 
In February 2015, President Barack Obama appointed Banga to serve as a member of the President's Advisory Committee for Trade Policy and Negotiations.

Since the 2020 elections, Banga has been an outside adviser to Vice President Kamala Harris as Chairman of the Partnership for Central America where he has led a group of business leaders who have advised her on the administration’s work in El Salvador, Guatemala and Honduras.

On February 23, 2023, Banga was nominated by President of the United States Joe Biden to lead the World Bank.

Other activities

Corporate boards 
 Exor, Member of the Board of Directors (since 2021)
 Temasek Holdings, Member of the Board of Directors (since 2021)
 BeyondNetZero, Member of the Advisory Board (since 2021)
 Dow Chemical Company, Member of the Board of Directors (2013–2021)

Non-profit organizations 
 Partnership for Central America (PCA), Chair (since 2022)
 International Chamber of Commerce (ICC), Chair (since 2020)
 American Red Cross (ARC), Member of the Board of Governors (since 2014)
 Economic Club of New York, Vice Chair of the Board
 Peterson Institute for International Economics, Member of the Board of Directors
 Trilateral Commission, Member
 American India Foundation, Co-Chair of the Board of Directors (2016–2019)
 New York Hall of Science, Vice Chair of the Board of Trustee
 National Urban League, Member of the Board

Recognition 
Banga was the keynote speaker at the NYU Stern 2014 Graduate Convocation on May 22, 2014, where he spoke about the importance of diversity in driving innovation and leadership. He also was a keynote speaker for his alma mater, the Indian Institute of Management Ahmedabad, during the Class of 2015's convocation. Banga is a regular speaker at various FinTech conferences and various leadership conferences. He also appeared on the Mad Money show hosted by Jim Cramer on Thursday, 6 Nov 2014

The Government of India awarded Banga the civilian honour of the Padma Shri in 2016.

See also 
 Indians in the New York City metropolitan area

References

External links 
 
 Ajay Banga at Penguin India

1960 births
20th-century American businesspeople
21st-century American businesspeople
American chief executives
American chief executives of financial services companies
American chief executives of Fortune 500 companies
American chief operating officers
American people of Indian descent
American people of Punjabi descent
American Sikhs
Businesspeople from Pune
Directors of Dow Inc.
Indian emigrants to the United States
Indian Institute of Management Ahmedabad alumni
Indian Sikhs
Living people
Peterson Institute for International Economics

Punjabi people
Recipients of the Padma Shri in trade and industry